Courtney Grace Sippel (born 27 April 2001) is an Australian cricketer who plays as a right-arm medium bowler and left-handed batter for Queensland Fire in the Women's National Cricket League (WNCL) and Brisbane Heat in the Women's Big Bash League (WBBL).  She played in seven matches for the Heat in the 2020–21 Women's Big Bash League season. She made her Queensland debut on 30 January 2021 against the ACT Meteors.

In January 2022, Sippel was named in Australia's A squad for their series against England A, with the matches being played alongside the Women's Ashes.

References

External links

Courtney Sippel at Cricket Australia

2001 births
Australian women cricketers
Brisbane Heat (WBBL) cricketers
Cricketers from Queensland
Living people
People from Kingaroy
Queensland Fire cricketers